Xiejiaji District is a district of the city of Huainan, Anhui Province, China.

Administrative divisions
In the present, Xiejiaji District has 5 subdistricts, 4 towns, 1 township and 1 ethic township.
5 Subdistricts

4 Towns

1 Township
 Sunmiao

1 Ethnic township
 Hui Gudui

References

Huainan